Kouta Camara (born June 8, 1995) is a Malian basketball player for ASA Sceaux and the Malian national team.

She participated at the 2017 Women's Afrobasket.

References

External links

1995 births
Living people
Malian women's basketball players
Small forwards
Malian expatriate basketball people in France
21st-century Malian people